Paracles vulpina is a moth of the subfamily Arctiinae first described by Jacob Hübner in 1825. It is found in Argentina and Brazil.

References

Moths described in 1825
Paracles